Bartonella kosoyi is a bacterium from the genus Bartonella.

References

Bartonellaceae
Bacteria described in 2020